Nelson College is the oldest state secondary school in New Zealand. It is an all-boys school in the City of Nelson that teaches from years 9 to 13. In addition, it runs a private preparatory school for year 7 and 8 boys. The school also has places for boarders, who live in two boarding houses adjacent to the main school buildings on the same campus.

A Nelson College old boy, Charles Monro, was instrumental in introducing the game of rugby into New Zealand.

History
The school opened with eight students on 7 April 1856 in premises in Trafalgar Square, Nelson, but shortly thereafter moved to a site in Manuka Street.  In 1861, the school moved again to its current site in Waimea Road. The Deed of Foundation was signed in 1857 and set out the curriculum to be followed by the College.  It included English language and literature, one or more modern languages, geography, mathematics, classics, history, drawing, music and such other branches of science as the Council of Governors should determine. The Deed stated that the purpose of the school was the "advancement of religion and morality, and the promotion of useful knowledge, by offering to the youth of the Province general education of a superior character."

In 1858, the General Assembly passed the Nelson College Act, which confirmed the status of the school. There were nine initial trustees, including Charles Elliott, David Monro, John Barnicoat, Charles Bigg Wither, William Wells, and Alfred Domett. In that same year, Alfred Fell gifted the common seal, containing the college's badge and motto, "Pietas, Probitas et Sapientia" (Loyalty, honesty and wisdom). A team from Nelson College took part in the first game of rugby played in New Zealand, against the Nelson Rugby Football Club on 14 May 1870 at what is now known as the Botanic Reserve, Nelson, and, in 1876, the first inter-College rugby match in New Zealand was played between Nelson College and Wellington College.

On 7 December 1904, the College was almost completely destroyed by fire.  The main building, designed by William Beatson, was said to be a "miniature of Eton," the architect being an old Etonian. In 1926, Nelson College was invited to join the annual rugby tournament between Christ's College, Wanganui Collegiate School and Wellington College, known as the "Quadrangular". In the 1929 Murchison earthquake, the main building of the College was once again severely damaged, although only two boys were injured.

In 2011, Nelson College became the first all-boys college in New Zealand to form a gay-straight alliance support group. The alliance operated from its own room. In 2017, the group was re-formed, after a failed attempt in 2015.

In 2019, long-serving and retiring headmaster Gary O'Shea claimed that the school needed more girls to stay up-to-date.

House system
The College has a house system with,  six different houses that compete across a range of sporting codes including cross country running and swimming together with varied cultural activities:
 Barnicoat-Rutherford Combined (White & Black)
 Chaytor (Red)
 Domett (Green)
 Monro (Blue)
 Robinson (Orange)
 Kahurangi (Yellow)

The two boarding houses, Rutherford and Barnicoat, recently underwent a five-year refurbishment. A third boarding house, Fell, was closed to boarders at the end of 2018, and is now available for lease, predominantly to sports and community groups.

Notable staff

Gilbert Archey, zoologist, museum director, ethnologist
Phil Costley, athlete
Edmond de Montalk, language teacher, storekeeper
Andrew Goodman, rugby union player
John Gully, artist
Wilfrid Nelson Isaac, jeweller, art school director
Frank Milner, school principal, educationalist
Harold Nelson, athlete
William Sutch, economist, public servant
Matthew Toynbee, cricketer

Headmasters
Since its foundation in 1856, Nelson College has had 21 Headmasters. The following is a complete list:

Notable alumni

 Harry Atkinson, socialist
 Michael Baigent, writer
 Tim Bell, computer scientist
 Leo Bensemann, artist
 Bronson Beri, basketball player
 Ethan Blackadder, rugby union player
 Wallace Chapman, TV & radio presenter
 Basil Collyns, Battle of Britain pilot and flying ace
 Wyatt Crockett, rugby union player
 Mitchell Drummond, rugby union player
 Jock Edwards, cricketer
 Henry Fa'arodo, footballer 
 Leicester Fainga'anuku, rugby union player
 David Havili, rugby union player
 William Hudson, civil engineer
 Mitchell Hunt, rugby union player
 Syd Jackson, Māori activist
 Jang Keun-suk, Korean actor, singer, and model
 Phill Jones, basketballer
 Gerald R. Leighton, zoologist
 James Lowe, rugby union player
 Nev MacEwan, rugby union player
 Don McKinnon, former Commonwealth Secretary-General
 Simon Mannering, rugby league player
 James Marshall, rugby union player
 Kerry Marshall, former Mayor of Richmond borough, Tasman and Nelson
 Julian Matthews, middle distance athlete
 Ben May, rugby union player
 Charles Monro, introduced rugby to New Zealand
 Tex Morton, singer
 Jack Newman, cricketer and businessman
 Geoffrey Palmer, former Prime Minister of New Zealand
 Jared Payne, rugby union player
 Wallace (Bill) Rowling, former Prime Minister of New Zealand
 Ernest Rutherford, 1st Baron Rutherford of Nelson, Nobel laureate, chemist and physicist
 Rex Sellers, sailor
 Fletcher Smith, rugby union player
 Leonard Trent, Battle of Britain pilot and Victoria Cross recipient
 Mika Vukona, basketballer
 Guy Williams, comedian
 Paul Williams, comedian
 Harry Wollaston, senior Australian public servant

References

Boarding schools in New Zealand
Boys' schools in New Zealand
Educational institutions established in 1856
Secondary schools in Nelson, New Zealand
1856 establishments in New Zealand